Ubirajara (Bira) Guimarães Almeida (born 1943), better known as Mestre Acordeon, is a native of Salvador, Bahia, Brazil, and a master (pt.: mestre) of the Brazilian martial art Capoeira. His international reputation as a teacher, performer, musician, organizer, and author is built upon fifty years of active practice, as well as research into the origins, traditions, political connotations, and contemporary trends of Capoeira. Mestre Acordeon has traveled extensively to promote Capoeira outside Brazil.

Acordeon was a student of the legendary Mestre Bimba in the late 1950s, and began teaching Capoeira himself in the early 1960s. In 1966, he founded the Grupo Folclorico da Bahia that performed the show Vem Camará: Histórias de Capoeira in the Teatro Jovem in Rio de Janeiro. The show presented an approach to Capoeira that influenced a new generation of young capoeiristas and affirmed the concept of grupo de Capoeira and today’s capoeira regional. He won three Brazilian Capoeira National Championships in the 1970s.

At the end of 1978 Mestre Acordeon came to the United States and soon introduced Capoeira to the West Coast. 1979 became a turning point in the global growth trajectory of Capoeira. Since then, and for the past four decades Mestre Acordeon has been the guiding light to a generation of Capoeira practitioners who followed him north to make a good living abroad through their art.

Mestre Acordeon maintains the United Capoeira Association (UCA) with several associated schools. He also has created the Capoeira Arts Foundation in Berkeley, California which sponsors UCA and Projeto Kirimurê, a social program for children in the neighborhood of Itapoã in Salvador, Bahia, Brazil.

Acordeon has recorded 9 CDs, produced 3 DVDs, and is the author of magazine articles and books about Capoeira, including Agua de Beber, Camará: A bate Papo de Capoeira, and the Capoeira Arts Café: An Academia de Capoeira.  His book Capoeira: A Brazilian Art Form, was the first Capoeira book in English. He has received honors in support of his practice, teaching, and research of Capoeira. Among them, in the Fall of 1994, he became the first "artist" to receive the Tinker Visiting Professorship at the University of Wisconsin–Madison. In 2008, in recognition of his thirty years of continuous work on the West Coast, the City of Berkeley proclaimed October 18 as Mestre Acordeon Day.

Mestre Acordeon's most recent endeavor was reminiscent in its audacity of his original journey to bring Capoeira to the West Coast of the United States nearly forty years ago. At the age of 70, on Labor Day 2013, he, his wife Suellen Einarsen also known as Mestra Suelly and nine of his disciples embarked on a 14,000 miles bicycle journey from Berkeley to his home town of Salvador de Bahia in Brazil. Their purpose was to raise funds and awareness for Projeto Kirimurê via making a documentary and a music CD about Capoeira's development in the Americas and about the year long journey. At www.b2bjogacapoeira.com you can find a trailer of the so far completed work.

Mestre Acordeon still spends much of his time traveling the world to teach Capoeira. Each year thousands of Capoeira students in all the world travel long distances to get a chance to learn from him.

References 

1943 births
Living people
Brazilian folklorists
Capoeira mestres
People from Salvador, Bahia